Efraim Benmelech is a financial economist.

Benmelech is the Henry Bullock Professor of Finance and Real Estate at the Kellogg School of Management at Northwestern University, the director of the Guthrie Center for real estate research and a research associate at the National Bureau of Economic Research (NBER).

He is a winner of the 2011 Brattle Prize for his article "Bankruptcy and Collateral Channel".

In 2013, Benmelech was associate editor of the Journal of Finance and editor of the Review of Corporate Finance Studies.

Benmelech earned his BA and MBA from Hebrew University and his PhD in finance from the University of Chicago Booth School of Business.

References

Kellogg School of Management faculty
Living people
Year of birth missing (living people)
American economists
Jerusalem School of Business Administration alumni
University of Chicago Booth School of Business alumni

-